Rhododendron calophytum, the beautiful-face rhododendron, is a species of flowering plant in the heath family Ericaceae that is native to the forests of central and eastern China, where it lives at altitudes of . In early Spring trusses of bell-shaped, white or pale pink flowers, spotted with maroon inside, are produced.

In cultivation in the UK, Rhododendron calophytum has gained the Royal Horticultural Society’s Award of Garden Merit. Like most rhododendrons it prefers an acid soil.

Lower taxa
Rhododendron calophytum var. calophytum	 	 	 
Rhododendron calophytum subsp. jinfuense Fang ex M.Y. Fang
Rhododendron calophytum var. jinfuense Fang & W.K. Hu
Rhododendron calophytum var. openshawianum (Rehder & E.H. Wilson) D.F. Chamb.
Rhododendron calophytum var. pauciflorum W.K. Hu

References

calophytum
Flora of China